Bobby Richard Hamm was an American writer and poet.

Early years

He was born in Winnfield, Louisiana, (May 7, 1934) to Clinton Cason Hamm and Annie Belle Kelly.  He was the youngest of five children.  He graduated from Bolton High School located in Alexandria, Louisiana in 1952.

Contribution to Cajun culture

Hamm was the premier and probably earliest proponent and supporter of the Cajun people.  His love of this part of Louisiana would initially prompt him to create the classic poem, "What is a Cajun".  Published in 1972, this work was available far before the Cajun culture would find popularity through wonderful culinary dishes.  Prior to this work, Louisiana was mostly noted for the food and antics of New Orleans.

In 1972, the Cajun people in Louisiana did not enjoy any prestige within the hierarchy of what was then the politics and social web of the state.  They were seen as backwards in every sense especially with respect to holding high office or governing.  In this situation, Bob Hamm took up the mantle of the Cajun people.  As a North Louisiana native, he could not claim kinship with these people.  He did, however, travel the south of Louisiana to find the essence of the Cajun people.

Family and career

On July 9, 1960, Hamm married Gloria Ann Lewis.  From this marriage, he had three sons.  They were Kurt Richard Hamm, Clinton Cason (Casey) Hamm, and Kevin Bruce Hamm.

Hamm served as the news director for the local TV station in Lafayette, Louisiana KATC (TV).  His nightly editorials chronicled not just life in Louisiana, but the national news as well. A longtime resident in Lafayette, Hamm had connections at all levels of Louisiana government.  He often said that he would have been more successful in life had he been able to "suffer fools".

Hamm continued to create works of poetry related to the Cajun people and their way of life.  These poems included "A Cajun Prayer", "A Cajun Toast", and "A Cajun Blessing".

Later life

Later in life, Hamm married again, creating a life with Leora Lacy.  During this time, he penned two books that brought a Cajun flair to everyday Nursery Rhymes.  Bob Hamm's Cajun Nursery Rhymes I and II.  His interpretation of these classics were spot on, and every Cajun understood his subtle changes.  He served as the editorial editor for the local newspaper, The Lafayette Daily Advertiser, while continuing to provide public relations consulting to various organizations.

Death

Hamm died on April 22, 2009.  His memorial, held in Lafayette, Louisiana, was attended by his wife, Leora, and his three boys.  His ashes were interred at Greenwood Cemetery in Pineville, Louisiana, on Monday, April 27, 2009.

External links
Bob Hamm's Website
Recalling Bob  
What is a Cajun  

1934 births
2009 deaths
20th-century American poets
Poets from Louisiana